Kosharitsa is a village in southeastern Bulgaria, near Bulgaria's Black Sea coast. It is in Nesebar Municipality of Burgas Province.

References

Villages in Burgas Province